In Burmese mythology, the thayé, also spelled 'tasei', are deceased evil people condemned to be disembodied spirits. They often appear as tall, dark people with huge ears, long tongues, and tusk-like teeth. Thayé enter towns at noon or at night, and usually cause minor illnesses.

The thayé is said have many faces and bodies; e.g., one might be a pregnant ghost with a fat white body and big ears. Others may be tall and slim, male, or with other varying characteristics.

References 

Burmese folklore
Burmese legendary creatures